The Bale Baronetcy, of Carleton Curlieu in the County of Leicester, was a title in the Baronetage of England. It was created on 3 November 1643 for John Bale of Carlton Curlieu Hall, Leicestershire, who had been High Sheriff of Leicestershire in 1624. The title became extinct on his death before 1654.

Bale baronets, of Carleton Curlieu (1643)
Sir John Bale, 1st Baronet (1617–died by 1654)

References
 

Extinct baronetcies in the Baronetage of England